Impact Wrestling is an American professional wrestling promotion based in Nashville, Tennessee. Title reigns are either determined by professional wrestling matches or are awarded to a wrestler as a result of the culmination of various scripted storylines. There are two active singles championships and one active tag team championship for (primarily) male wrestlers, a singles and tag team championship specifically for female wrestlers, and an open championship available to anyone.

Nine wrestlers currently hold the championships. The list includes the number of times the wrestler has held the title, the date and location of the win, and a description of the winning bout.

Overview

Men 
At the top of Impact championship hierarchy is the Impact World Championship. The championship is currently held by Josh Alexander, who is in his second reign. He defeated Moose on April 23, 2022 at Rebellion to win the title.

The secondary title is the Impact X Division Championship, which is currently held by two-time champion Trey Miguel, who defeated Black Taurus in a tournament final at Over Drive on November 18, 2022 to win the vacant title.  Previous champion Frankie Kazarian relinquished the title to invoke Option C for a World Championship match. 

The Impact World Tag Team Championship is currently held by first time tile holders Bullet Club (Ace Austin and Chris Bey), who defeated The Motor City Machine Guns (Chris Sabin and Alex Shelley) on February 25, 2023 during the Impact tapings to win the titles (aired March 2)

A wrestler who has held the World, X Division, and Tag Team Championships is recognized to have won the Impact Wrestling Triple Crown. If any winner of the Triple Crown has also won either the TNA Television Championship or the Impact Grand Championship (both defunct), they are also recognized to have won the Impact Wrestling Grand Slam.

Women 

The top championship for female tag teams is the Impact Knockouts World Tag Team Championship, which is held by The Coven (Taylor Wilde and KiLynn King), who are in their first reign as a team.  Individually, this is Wilde's record tying third reign and King's first.  They defeated The Death Dollz (represented by Rosemary and Taya Valkyrie) on February 26, 2023 during the Impact tapings to win the titles (aired March 16)

Open 
The Impact Digital Media Championship is an open championship that is primarily - though not exclusively - defended on Impact's online platforms. Joe Hendry is the current champion in his first reign. He defeated Brian Myers on October 22, 2022 during the Impact tapings to win the title (aired November 10).

A female wrestler who has held the Knockouts, Knockouts Tag Team and Digital Media Championships is considered to have won the Knockouts Triple Crown.

Current champions 

See also
List of former championships in Impact Wrestling
List of Impact Wrestling personnel

References

External links

 
Impact Wrestling champions lists